Eugenio Bonicco (30 August 1919 – 6 November 1987) was an Italian alpine skier. He competed in the men's downhill at the 1948 Winter Olympics.

References

External links
 

1919 births
1987 deaths
Italian male alpine skiers
Olympic alpine skiers of Italy
Alpine skiers at the 1948 Winter Olympics
Sportspeople from the Province of Cuneo
20th-century Italian people